Adam Bisnowaty (born December 14, 1993) is a former American football tackle. He played college football for the Pittsburgh Panthers as a four-year starter at left tackle, and was First-team All-Atlantic Coast Conference his last two seasons. He played in the National Football League (NFL) for the New York Giants.

Early life
Bisnowaty was born in Pittsburgh, Pennsylvania, and is Jewish. His parents are Miron and Randi Bisnowaty. He has a sister, Dana Bisnowaty. His father is Israeli-born, grew up in Rishon LeZion, served in the Agaf HaModi'in (the military intelligence unit of the Israel Defense Forces), and came to the United States at the age of 27.  Adam's paternal grandmother is a Holocaust survivor who escaped the Nazis by hiding in the woods in Poland.

Bisnowaty said: "I have a deep connection with Israel, my two parents are Jewish, my father is from Israel, and a large part of my family still lives there." He has a large Hebrew tattoo on his left arm, which translates to "I am what I am," which in the Old Testament God said to Moses when Moses asked what to call him.

Growing up, he preferred basketball, baseball, and wrestling to football.

High school career
At Fox Chapel Area High School in Pennsylvania, Bisnowaty played offensive guard and tackle, was ranked the country's # 19 recruit by Rivals, and was a four-star recruit. He was named Pennsylvania Football News All-Class AAAA, and all-conference at defensive tackle. He also competed in wrestling for the high school, and in track and field—throwing discus, javelin, and shot put (for which he holds the school record at 43' 7").

College career
Bisnowaty played college football for the Pittsburgh Panthers, choosing them over Florida and 12 other offers. He earned an undergraduate degree from Pittsburgh in communications in 2015, and a master's degree in health and fitness.

In 2012, he redshirted.  Subsequently, Bisnowaty was a four-year starter at left tackle.  He was named to the Jewish Sports Review 2014 College Football All-America Offensive Team. He was a First-team All-Atlantic Coast Conference (ACC) selection in each of his final seasons, and was named to the All-ACC Academic team for four consecutive years. As a senior in 2016 he started every game at left tackle. He finished his college career with 43 starts in 45 games.

Professional career

New York Giants
Bisnowaty was drafted by the New York Giants in the sixth round, 200th overall, of the 2017 NFL Draft. The Giants traded up seven spots to draft him. He signed with the team in May 2017, on a four-year deal worth $2.5 million with a $147,000 signing bonus. In June 2017, Giants' offensive line coach Mike Solari said: "It's still early. Right now, we got him at right tackle. But he has versatility, he could go to guard." He was waived on September 2, 2017, and was signed to the Giants' practice squad the next day. He was promoted to the active roster on December 30, 2017. The following day, he was the starting right tackle for the Giants in his NFL debut.

On May 14, 2018, Bisnowaty was waived by the Giants.

Detroit Lions
On May 15, 2018, Bisnowaty was claimed off waivers by the Detroit Lions. He was waived on July 31, 2018.

Carolina Panthers
On August 1, 2018, Bisnowaty was claimed off waivers by the Carolina Panthers. He was waived on August 31, 2018.

Minnesota Vikings
On October 23, 2018, Bisnowaty was signed to the Minnesota Vikings practice squad. He reunited with college teammate Brian O'Neill. He signed a reserve/future contract with the Vikings on January 2, 2019. He was waived on May 8, 2019.

Washington Redskins
On May 23, 2019, Bisnowaty signed with the Washington Redskins, but was waived five days later.

Denver Broncos
On August 9, 2019, Bisnowaty was signed by the Denver Broncos. He was waived on August 31, 2019.

Bisnowaty was drafted in the 7th round in phase two in the 2020 XFL Draft by the Dallas Renegades.

See also
List of select Jewish football players

References

External links
Pittsburgh Panthers bio
Twitter
New York Giants bio

1993 births
Living people
Players of American football from Pittsburgh
American people of Israeli descent
American football offensive tackles
American football offensive guards
Jewish American sportspeople
Pittsburgh Panthers football players
New York Giants players
Detroit Lions players
Carolina Panthers players
Minnesota Vikings players
Washington Redskins players
Denver Broncos players
21st-century American Jews